Anthony John Archer (born 14 July 1938, Dulwich, London) is an English jazz double-bassist.

Archer studied cello as a schoolboy before settling on upright bass. He joined Don Rendell's group in 1961, then with Roy Budd and Eddie Thompson before beginning work with Tony Lee, with whom he would collaborate for many years as part of Lee's trio, particularly at The Bull's Head public house and music venue in Barnes, South West London as well as Ronnie Scott's Jazz Club. He later played with Brian Lemon, Sandy Brown, Harold McNair, John Dankworth, and in the Best of British Jazz group with Kenny Baker and Don Lusher. Archer continued to work with Lee nearly until Lee's death in 2004.

References

Nevil Skrimshire, "Tony Archer". The New Grove Dictionary of Jazz.
Eugene Chadbourne, [ Tony Archer] at Allmusic

1938 births
Living people
British jazz double-bassists
Male double-bassists
British male jazz musicians
People from Dulwich
21st-century double-bassists
21st-century British male musicians